Krasnaya Sloboda is a rural locality (a selo) in Konstantinovsky Selsoviet, Kulundinsky District, Altai Krai, Russia. The population was 93 as of 2013. There are 3 streets.

Geography 
Krasnaya Sloboda is located 31 km northeast of Kulunda (the district's administrative centre) by road. Zlatopol is the nearest rural locality.

References 

Rural localities in Kulundinsky District